The Flavor of Corn (also known in English as The Taste of Wheat) is a 1986 Italian coming-of-age film. Written and directed by Gianni Da Campo, the film stars Lorenzo Lena and Marco Mestriner and follows the story of a relationship between a professor and his 12-year-old student.

Plot

Lorenzo is a young man, who has been appointed as a school teacher in a small Italian village. One of his  pupils, 12-year-old boy named Duilio, has romantic feelings toward Lorenzo. Lorenzo visits Duilio's home, meets with his family and they become good friends.
Lorenzo then meets a woman with whom he falls in love. Lorenzo's relationship with the woman is unfulfilling and they break up.
During this time, Lorenzo grows closer to Duilio and they begin a secret romantic relationship. Many things change after Duilio’s stepmother begins to distrust Lorenzo. They begin to meet very rarely and Duilio starts to behave desperately to see Lorenzo. Lorenzo reflects on the nature of their relationship and decides to leave the village and Duilio.

Cast
 Lorenzo Lena as Lorenzo
 Marco Mestriner as Duilio
 Alba Mottura as Cecilia
 Egidio Termine as Bruno
 Mattia Pinoli as Grandpa
 Paolo Garlato as Father
 Elena Barbalich as Adalgisa
 Elisabetta Barbini as Grandma
 Marina Vlady as Stepmother

Reception
The Seattle Times lauded the film for being "unflinchingly honest" and the San Francisco Bay Area Reporter described the story as "fascinating", adding that the film "approaches its forbidden topic with an even hand and a warm heart."  In September 2012, a "special event" screening of the film was arranged as part of a 1980s retrospective at the 17th Milano Film Festival, which touted the film as a "hidden jewel" that managed to avoid the familiar tropes and clichés employed by other films of the genre.

Accolades

Home media
Since its original release in 1986, the film has been subtitled in various languages and distributed internationally on VHS and DVD in numerous countries, including Italy (released as Il sapore del grano), China (translated as The Taste of Wheat), Germany (released as Die Qual der Liebe), and the United States (released as The Flavor of Corn).  In 1994, Award Films International released the film in North America in the VHS format with English subtitles.  As of 2013, no evidence of an official North American DVD release has been found.  However, in November 2011, Ripley's Home Video released the film in Italy in the Region 2 DVD format, which includes the option to watch with English subtitles.

References

External links 

1986 films
Italian LGBT-related films
Juvenile sexuality in films
Teen LGBT-related films
LGBT-related coming-of-age films
1986 LGBT-related films
1980s Italian films